"Remind Me" is a song by English singer-songwriter Tom Grennan. It was released on 18 March 2022 as the lead single from his forthcoming third studio album What Ifs & Maybes (2023).

Background
Speaking about the song, Grennan said, "I wanted to write a song that reminded me of a moment in my life where I realised I had given up something that was really making a difference in my life – in a good way. It's about reconnecting. It's that feeling when you're at the top of the rollercoaster and you're like: this is the best feeling".

Music video
An accompanying video was released on 7 April 2022.

Track listings

Charts

Weekly charts

Year-end charts

Certifications

References

 

 

 
2022 songs
2022 singles
Tom Grennan songs
Songs written by Tom Grennan